Cao Yan (died 223) was a prince in the state of Cao Wei in the Three Kingdoms period of China. He was a son of Cao Pi, the first emperor of Wei. His mother, Consort Song (宋姬), was a concubine of Cao Pi. He was enfeoffed as the Prince of Guangping (廣平王) in 222. After his death in the following year, his princedom was abolished because he had no son to inherit it.

See also
 Cao Wei family trees#Consorts Li, Su, Zhang, and Song
 Lists of people of the Three Kingdoms

References

 Chen, Shou (3rd century). Records of the Three Kingdoms (Sanguozhi).

Year of birth unknown
223 deaths
Cao Wei imperial princes